KICS (1550 AM) is a radio station broadcasting a sports format.  Licensed to Hastings, Nebraska, United States, the station serves the Hastings-Grand Island-Kearney area.  The station is currently owned by Flood Communications Tri-Cities, L.L.C. and features programming from ESPN Radio and Westwood One.

The majority of the programming is simulcast with sister station KXPN.

References

External links

FCC History Cards for KICS

ICS
ESPN Radio stations
Radio stations established in 1997